Khachardzan is a village in the Dilijan Municipality of the Tavush Province of Armenia. Prior to the Nagorno-Karabakh conflict, the village was populated by Muslims. In 1988–1989, Armenian refugees from Azerbaijan settled in the village.

Etymology 
The former name of the village, Polad Ayrum reflects the presence of the Turkic Ayrum people. Khachardzan literally means cross-statue in Armenian.

Gallery

References

External links 

Populated places in Tavush Province